Cerastipsocus is a genus of common barklice in the family Psocidae. There are more than 20 described species in Cerastipsocus.

Species
These 27 species belong to the genus Cerastipsocus:

 Cerastipsocus aldretei Badonnel, 1986
 Cerastipsocus beaveri New, 1972
 Cerastipsocus bogotanus (Kolbe, 1883)
 Cerastipsocus brasilianus (Enderlein, 1903)
 Cerastipsocus claripennis Mockford, 1996
 Cerastipsocus coloratus (Kolbe, 1883)
 Cerastipsocus consocius (Navas, 1934)
 Cerastipsocus cornutus Mockford, 1996
 Cerastipsocus cubanus Enderlein, 1919
 Cerastipsocus dubius Badonnel, 1969
 Cerastipsocus fuscipennis (Burmeister, 1839)
 Cerastipsocus iguazuensis (Williner, 1945)
 Cerastipsocus infectus (McLachlan, 1866)
 Cerastipsocus kolbei New, 1972
 Cerastipsocus macrostigmatus Li & Yang, 1987
 Cerastipsocus moestus (Kolbe, 1883)
 Cerastipsocus ochraceocristatus (Enderlein, 1900)
 Cerastipsocus pallidinervis (Kolbe, 1883)
 Cerastipsocus reductus (Banks, 1920)
 Cerastipsocus rufus (Navas, 1912)
 Cerastipsocus rugosus New & Thornton, 1975
 Cerastipsocus sivorii (Ribaga, 1908)
 Cerastipsocus tostus (Navas, 1924)
 Cerastipsocus trifasciatus (Provancher, 1876)
 Cerastipsocus venosus (Burmeister, 1839)
 Cerastipsocus vetustus (Kolbe, 1883)
 Cerastipsocus willineri New & Thornton, 1975

References

External links

 

Psocidae
Articles created by Qbugbot